Memmo may refer to:

 Marcantonio Memmo (1536–1615), 91st Doge of Venice
 Tribuno Memmo (died 991), 25th Doge of Venice
 Memmo Carotenuto (1908–1980), Italian actor
 Memmo di Filippuccio, Italian painter

See also
 Memo (disambiguation)
 Memmi (disambiguation)